Cyclamic acid is a compound with formula  C6H13NO3S.

It is included in E number "E952".

Cyclamic acid is mainly used as catalyst in the production of paints and plastics, and furthermore as a reagent for laboratory usage.

The sodium and calcium salts of cyclamic acid are used as artificial sweeteners under the name cyclamate.

References

Amines
Sulfamates
Cyclohexyl compounds